Shooting Clerks is a British-American biographical comedy-drama film directed by Christopher Downie and starring Brian O'Halloran, Mark Frost, Jason Mewes, Scott Schiaffo, Matthew Postlethwaite and Kevin Smith. It was produced by Auld Reekie Media. It had a preview screening in Orlando, Florida on October 22, 2016. The film had a special screening in Kevin Smith's home town of Atlantic Highlands, New Jersey on November 11, 2016.

The film had an advance UK screening at the Prince Charles Cinema, London on January 16, 2018.

The film was given a special advance screening at San Diego Comic-Con on July 20, 2019, in celebration of the 25th anniversary of the release of Clerks.

Summary
A biographical dramedy detailing how Kevin Smith bankrolled his $27,000 first film with maxed-out credit cards and garnered career-making critical attention at the Sundance Film Festival when Clerks debuted there in 1994.

Cast

Production
The original Indiegogo fundraiser, set up to fund the project, reached 9% (£2,540) of its target. Two additional fundraisers, one for finishing funds, the other for post-production, reached 103% (US$3,605) and 109% (US$2,120), respectively. Filming took place in St Andrews, Scotland; Florida; and New Jersey, respectively.

On March 27, 2016, the teaser trailer was released.

In September 2016, the trailer for the film was released.

Reception

Awards
The film won the Orlando Film Festival Indie Spirit Award.
The film also won "Audience Choice Feature Film" at Monmouth Film Festival.

Release
Shooting Clerks had a preview screening in Orlando, Florida on October 22, 2016. The film had a special screening in Kevin Smith's home town of Atlantic Highlands, New Jersey on November 11, 2016.

On January 16, 2018, the film had an advance screening at the Prince Charles Cinema, London.

On July 20, 2019, a final cut of the film was screened at San Diego Comic-Con, in celebration of the 25th anniversary of Clerks release.

References

External links

2016 films
British biographical films
British comedy-drama films
American biographical films
American comedy-drama films
Films shot in Scotland
Films shot in New Jersey
Films shot in Vancouver
View Askewniverse
2010s English-language films
2010s American films
2010s British films